Pirojpur is a district (zilla) in southern-western Bangladesh. It is a part of Barisal Division.

Etymology
According to some, the second son of Subedar Shah Shuja, Firoz Shah, died in this area, and the area became known subsequently as 'Firozpur'.  In time, the pronunciation 'Firozpur' slowly muted to 'Pirozpur' and later 'Pirojpur'.

Geography
Most of the land is low-lying and the soil is fertile. There are small forests. Nesarabad is known for its business centre and also for the Sundori tree (a kind of mangrove) that grows there.

Rivers
Gabkhan, Baleshwar, Damodar, Kocha, Pona, Kochakhali, Kaliganga, Sandha, Doratana etc. are big and known rivers.

The Baleshwar, the river that is situated to the east of Sunder Bans splits into two parts, but this is getting smaller and smaller day by day. One is known as Doratana which flows through Bagerhat and the other and mightier one is known as Kacha which flows through Bhandaria. Then it has an offshoot Baleshwar which later meets with Doratana and falls into Kaliganga near Mativanga, Najirpur. And Kocha splits into two river Kaliganga and Sandha. Kaliganga flows to the north meets with Baleshwar and flow to further north. and Sandha flows to the east. Later Sandha coalesce with Arial Khan and falls into the Meghna.

Demographics 

Pirojpur District had a population of 1,113,257 according to the 2011 Bangladesh census, of which 548,228 were males and 565,029 females. 930,626 (83.59%) were rural and 182,631 (16.41%) were urban. The literacy rate was 64.85%: 65.04% for males and 64.68% for females.

Religion

Islam is the predominant religion in the district, along with a large Hindu minority. But similar to other districts in the Barisal division, the minority Hindu population have not only seen a decline in their share of population, but also their absolute numbers, in the 2001-2011 period. The percentage share of Hindus is the largest in Nazirpur Upazila and the lowest in Zianagar Upazila.

There are 3,087 mosques and 1,051 temples.

Administration
The subdivision (then a mohokooma, now a zilla) of Pirojpur was created on 28 October 1859 Pirojpur district was formed on 1 March 1984 and the municipality was formed in 1885. The area of Pirojpur is 1277.80 km2. It is under Barisal Division. There are three municipalities in Pirojpur named Pirojpur, Bhandaria, Mathbaria. There are seven upazilas (sub districts) in Pirojpur district: Pirojpur Sadar, Bhandaria, Mathbaria, Indurkani, Nazirpur, Nesarabad and Kawkhali. Of these, Mathbaria is the largest (353.25 km2; it occupies 27.01% of the total area of the district). Kawkhali is the smallest (79.65 km2). Pirojpur District also contains 52 unions, 390 mauzas and 648 villages.
 Chairman of Zilla Porishod : Mahiuddin Maharaj
 Deputy Commissioner (DC) : Abu Ali Mohammad Sajjad Hossain

Borders
Pirojpur District is bordered by Barisal and Gopalganj districts to the north, Barguna district to the south, Jhalokati and Barguna districts to the east, Bagerhat district and The Sundarbans, the world's largest mangrove forest to the west.

Sub-districts (Upazillas)
There are seven Sub-districts in Pirojpur and their population are given below:

Transportation

Buses 
There are two bus terminals in Pirojpur, Pirojpur Bus terminal and Pirojpur Old Bus Terminal. Many Bus company connect Pirojpur to other districts like Dhaka and many more.

Riverine
Launches, steamers and boats are used for travelling on the rivers. The local port is called Hoolarhaat Launch Station (ghaat)serving as the primary port for Pirojpur. It is situated some 5 km east to the Pirojpur town and the river port stands on Kaliganga. Beside it is the steamer wharf. Launches destined to Dhaka and other parts of the country regularly start from here.

Tourist attractions

 Tasmima Villa, Bhandaria
 Bhandaria Thana Echo Park, Bhandaria
 Aman Ullah Collage, (Baridara Complex), Khatalia Road, Bhandaria.
 Minister Bari Mosque, Bhandaria.
 Kuriana Floating Market
 Kuriana Guava Garden
 Momin Mosque
 Chanmari Shooting Spot
 Pirojpur River View Eco Park (locally known as DC Park)
 Rayerkathi Raaj Bari
 Horinpala River View Eco Park, Telikhali Union, Mathbaria
 Shapleza Kuthibari, Mathbaria
 Baleshwari,River

Economy

Agriculture is the main source of income for rural people here. There are also other sources of income which are mainly city based. They are given below:
 Agriculture 50.82%
 Commerce 18.71%
 Service 7.69%
 Non-agricultural labour 5.75%
 Transport and communication 2.16%,
 Religious service 1.61%
 Construction 1.36%
 Rent and remittance 0.95%
 Industry 0.78%
 Others 10.17%

Agricultural products
Paddy, Jute, Sugar Cane, Wheat, Guava, Banana, Coconut, Hog-plum, Betel Leaf, Betel Nuts are the chief Agricultural Products produced here.

Media
Print media:
 Manobkantha (national)
 Sangbad (national)
 Prothom Alo (national)
 Kaler Kantho (national)
 Samakal (national)
 Dainik Janakantha (national)
 Jugantor (national)
 Pirojpurer Kotha (local)

Notable people
 Ahsan Habib
 Anwar Hossain Manju
 Delwar Hossain Sayeedi, Islamic scholar and politician
 Hatem Ali Jamadar, member of the Bengal Legislative Assembly
 Jewel Aich
 Jannatul Ferdous Oishee, model, was born at Matibhanga village and completed her HSC in Nazirpur.
 Khalid Hassan Milu
 Tofazzal Hossain Manik Miah
 SM Rezaul Karim
 Nesaruddin Ahmad, first Pir of Sarsina
 Abu Zafar Mohammad Saleh, Islamic scholar and Independence Award recipient

See also
 Pirojpur
 Districts of Bangladesh

Notes

References

 
Districts of Bangladesh